Katie Victoria "Kate" Magowan (born 1 June 1975) is an English actress and producer. She started her career playing Helen Jensen in 74 episodes of Dream Team (1998–1999). She appeared in 24 Hour Party People (2002), It's All Gone Pete Tong (2004), as Princess Una in Stardust (2007), Primeval (2009), A Lonely Place to Die and Exile (2011), Elfie Hopkins and Outside Bet (2012), Spotless (2015), and she portrayed Sadie Young in EastEnders between 2013 – 2014.

Early life
After finishing high school, and having trained as a dancer, she graduated from The Actors' Institute (TAI), Swindon.

Acting career 
She began her screen career in season 2 of Dream Team, Sky 1's first original drama series. She went on to appear in many films and television roles including the role of Princess Una in the magical film Stardust in 2007, Kidulthood, 4.3.2.1., Screwed, A Lonely Place to Die and It's All Gone Pete Tong.

Stage
She made her stage debut as a student of TAI, in a production of Caryl Churchill's Top Girls

Television
Magowan appeared in Spotless, playing Sonny Clay. She has also featured in two episodes of the third series of Primeval as Eve. She also stars as Martha Bannerman in four episodes of A Dinner of Herbs by Catherine Cookson, a TV series made for British television. She appeared in series 15 of Silent Witness in the two-part story 'Domestic' as murder victim Justine Thompson.

From 2013 to 2014, she played Sadie Young for 41 episodes of EastEnders.

Film
Her film credits include leading roles in Michael Winterbottom's 24 Hour Party People, Sonya in It's All Gone Pete Tong, Princess Una in Stardust, Jenny in A Lonely Place to Die, Danielle in Screwed, Mrs Gammon in Elfie Hopkins and Natalie in Outside Bet.

Personal life 
Magowan married actor John Simm in April 2004 in the Forest of Dean. They have two children: son Ryan and daughter Mollie.

Magowan and Simm have appeared together in four films: 24 Hour Party People, Is Harry On The Boat?, the award-winning short film Devilwood and the heist thriller Tuesday, as well as in the BBC Series Exile.

Filmography

References

External links
 

1975 births
Living people
English film actresses
English stage actresses
English television actresses
People from Harrow, London
Actresses from London
English soap opera actresses
20th-century English actresses
21st-century English actresses